Patrick Buckley may refer to:

Paddy Buckley (1925–2008), Scottish international footballer
Patrick Buckley (politician) (1841–1896), Irish New Zealand soldier, lawyer, politician

See also
Pat Buckley (disambiguation)